Luiz Felipe Faria de Azevedo, also commonly known as Luiz Felipe (born 8 October 1964) is a Brazilian former professional basketball player. With the senior Brazilian national basketball team, De Azevedo competed at the 1988 Summer Olympics, and the 1990 FIBA World Cup.

References

External links
 

1964 births
Living people
Basketball players at the 1988 Summer Olympics
Brazilian men's basketball players
1990 FIBA World Championship players
Olympic basketball players of Brazil
People from Vitória, Espírito Santo
Small forwards
Sportspeople from Espírito Santo